Richard Gasquet was the defending champion but chose to compete in Rome instead.
Marc Gicquel won the title, defeating Horacio Zeballos 6–2, 6–4 in the final.

Seeds

Draw

Finals

Top half

Bottom half

External Links
Main Draw
Main Draw (archived)
Qualifying Singles

BNP Paribas Primrose Bordeaux - Singles
2011 Singles